PHA-57378 is a drug which acts as an agonist at serotonin 5-HT2 receptors, having a binding affinity of 4.1 nM at the 5-HT2A subtype and 4.3 nM at 5-HT2C. It has anxiolytic effects in animal studies.

See also 
 PNU-22394
 PNU-181731

References 

Serotonin receptor agonists
Tryptamines